Jeff Henderson is an American chef, bestselling author and popular public speaker.  He is also a former felon, having served nearly a decade in prison for cocaine.

Early and personal life
Henderson was stabbed in the chest when he was 16 over a gang-related dispute. In 1988, he was arrested by the San Diego Drug Task Force and charge with intent to distribute illegal narcotics.

Henderson currently lives in Las Vegas with his wife Stacy and five children.

Career
In 2001, Henderson became the first African-American Chef de Cuisine at Caesars Palace. He eventually became an executive chef at several top restaurants including Café Bellagio, where he worked until 2006.

Television shows

The Chef Jeff Project
The Chef Jeff Project is a Food Network reality television program that aired in the fall of 2008.  Chef Jeff invites six young adults with rough backgrounds to work as his crew for Posh Urban Cuisine for one month in Los Angeles.  The format of the reality television program is such that all participants who complete the project are eligible for the Food Network Scholarship to culinary school. The aim of the competition test each individual to the limits and not eliminate the competition; Henderson makes it clear to the competitors that the only way they can lose is if they quit.

Family Style with Chef Jeff
Family Style with Chef Jeff is a new show premiering Fall 2013 produced by Bellum Entertainment Group for national syndication in the US. Family Style is an E/I program which demonstrates how good choices in the kitchen can lead to a life changing experience for the whole family.

Flip My Food with Chef Jeff
Jeff "flips" the favorite dishes of award-winning chefs, celebrities, and everyday people to make a healthier version that's just as mouthwatering.  This show debuted on September 7, 2015.

Cook Books

References

Year of birth missing (living people)
Living people
American chefs
American male chefs
African-American writers
American writers
People from Los Angeles
People from the Las Vegas Valley
21st-century African-American people